Barygenys nana is a species of frog in the family Microhylidae. It is endemic to New Guinea and is known from the mountains of Eastern Highlands and Western Highlands Provinces, Papua New Guinea. The specific name nana refers to the small size of this species. Common name highland Papua frog has been proposed for it.

Description
The holotype, a male presumed to be adult, measures  in snout–vent length, whereas adult females measure  in snout–vent length. The eyes are small, although relatively large compared to other Barygenys species. The snout is pointed. The tympanum is only faintly visible. The fingers are short, broad at the base but tapering to narrow, rounded tips. The toes are unwebbed. Skin is smooth, except in the post-sacral region and the hind legs where it becomes pustulose; the degree of rugosity varies greatly between individuals. Preserved specimens are dorsally light brown with some darker infuscation. The ventral surfaces are light brown with fine, darker mottling. The chin is slightly lighter than the rest of the lower surfaces.

Habitat and conservation
It is considered not to be common. Development is presumably direct (i.e., there is no free-living larval stage). There are no known threats to this species. It is not known to occur in any protected areas.

References

nana
Amphibians of New Guinea
Amphibians of Papua New Guinea
Endemic fauna of New Guinea
Endemic fauna of Papua New Guinea
Taxa named by Richard G. Zweifel
Amphibians described in 1972
Taxonomy articles created by Polbot